The Mexican Spitfire's Baby is a 1941 American comedy film directed by Leslie Goodwins and written by Charles E. Roberts and Jerome Cady. It is the sequel to the 1940 film Mexican Spitfire Out West. The film stars Lupe Vélez, Leon Errol, Charles "Buddy" Rogers, ZaSu Pitts, Elisabeth Risdon and Fritz Feld. The film was released on November 28, 1941, by RKO Pictures.

Plot

The Lindsays decide to adopt a war orphan, except this refugee turns out to be a glamour girl 20-something orphaned during World War One.

Cast 
 Lupe Vélez as Carmelita Lindsay
 Leon Errol as Uncle Matt Lindsay / Lord Basil Epping
 Charles "Buddy" Rogers as Dennis Lindsay
 ZaSu Pitts as Miss Emily Pepper
 Elisabeth Risdon as Aunt Della
 Fritz Feld as Lt. Pierre Gaston de la Blanc
 Marion Martin as Fifi
 Lloyd Corrigan as Chumley
 Lydia Bilbrook as Lady Ada Epping
 Vinton Hayworth as Rudolph

References

External links 
 
 
 
 

1941 films
American black-and-white films
RKO Pictures films
Films directed by Leslie Goodwins
1941 comedy films
American comedy films
Films produced by Cliff Reid
1940s English-language films
1940s American films